The Bayreuth premiere cast of Parsifal lists the contributors to the new productions of Richard Wagner's inaugural stage play Parsifal, including the premiere, which took place on 26 July 1882 at the Bayreuth Festival.

About the performance history 
In the last performance of the premiere series in 1882, Richard Wagner personally took over the baton from Hermann Levi in Act III, unnoticed by the audience, since the overbuilt orchestra pit of the Festspielhaus made the conductor and the orchestra invisible to the public. It was the only time the composer conducted in his house himself.

Parsifal was composed especially for the Bayreuth Festival Theatre and, as Wagner stated in a letter to King Ludwig II of Bavaria in 1880, was to be performed there exclusively. The premiere production was virtually sacrosanct in Bayreuth and remained almost unchanged on the festival programme for 51 years. Hermann Levi remained conductor until 1894, only in 1888 (and then in 1897) Felix Mottl conducted Felix Mottl. Later, Franz Fischer and Karl Muck also took over the musical direction of the Parsifal festival performances.

The protection period of 30 years after the composer's death ended on December 31, 1913, but as early as 1901, the widow of the composer and director of the Festival, Cosima Wagner, turned to the German Reichstag with the request to secure the sole performing rights for Bayreuth. The request was rejected. Already before the end of the protection period, unauthorized performances took place, for example at the Metropolitan Opera in New York on 24 December 1903, on Cosima's 66th birthday, and in Amsterdam.<ref name="faz">Christian Wildhagen: History of "Parsifal": The Grail Robbery of Bayreuth Frankfurter Allgemeine Zeitung, 22 January 2014, retrieved on 22 July 2020.</ref>

After the end of the protection period, forty productions of the work were staged within the month of January 1914. The first of these legal productions began on New Year's Eve 1913 at 11:30 a.m. in the Teatro Liceu of Barcelona.Wagneropera.net: Parsifal, retrieved on 22 July 2020. To this day Parsifal is the most frequently performed work of the Bayreuth Festival.

 1934 
It was not until 1934 that a new production with stage designs by Alfred Roller, Hitler's favourite stage designer, was shown, commissioned by Hitler. After the politically motivated cancellation of Arturo Toscanini, who was supposed to conduct the new production, Richard Strauss stepped in.

After the beginning of the Second World War, the work - presumably because of its message of reconciliation - was no longer allowed to be performed in Bayreuth at Hitler's behest. As if by a miracle, the Bayreuth Festival Theatre was not destroyed in the Allied bombing war, but two thirds of the city lay in ruins. Half of the Villa Wahnfried was also destroyed on 5 April 1945, and the hall, including the rotunda and the floor above it, as well as the southeastern part of the house were blown up.

 1951 
When the Bayreuth Festival was able to reinstate itself in 1951, the new artistic director of the Festival, Wieland Wagner presented a radical new version of Parsifal'' as the first production of the "New Bayreuth". He dispensed with a detailed naturalism and placed the music in the foreground through abstraction and suggestive lighting direction. The events on stage were expressively condensed and only underlined by extremely withdrawn, stylized and meaningful gestures and movements. His Bayreuth staging style became a much-copied model for numerous Wagner productions up to the 1970s. The new production was conducted by Hans Knappertsbusch and has also been released on record. Wieland Wagner's production remained on the Bayreuth repertoire for more than twenty years and reached 101 performances. The premiere was cast with the world's best Wagner singers, including Wolfgang Windgassen in the title role, Martha Mödl as Kundry and George London as Amfortas.

Premiere castings 
The sixth column shows the number of performances of each production.

Sources 
 Inszenierungsübersicht der Bayreuther Festspiele (vollständig ab 1951), retrieved 22 July 2020
 Tamino Autographs, Besetzungszettel der Aufführung vom 23. August 1934, retrieved 22 July 2020
 Tamino Autographs, Besetzungszettel der Aufführung vom 23. Juli 1937, retrieved 22 July 2020

References 

Bayreuth Festival
Richard Wagner